The canton of Plateau d'Hauteville (before February 2021: canton of Hauteville-Lompnes) is an administrative division in eastern France. At the French canton reorganisation which came into effect in March 2015, the canton was expanded from 6 to 41 communes (20 of which have since merged into the new communes of Champdor-Corcelles,  Culoz-Béon, Haut-Valromey, Plateau d'Hauteville, Valromey-sur-Séran and Arvière-en-Valromey):
 
Anglefort
Aranc
Armix
Artemare
Arvière-en-Valromey
Brénod 
Chaley
Champagne-en-Valromey
Champdor-Corcelles
Chevillard
Condamine
Corbonod
Corlier
Culoz-Béon
Évosges
Haut-Valromey
Izenave
Lantenay 
Outriaz
Plateau d'Hauteville
Prémillieu
Ruffieu
Seyssel
Talissieu
Tenay
Valromey-sur-Séran
Vieu-d'Izenave

Demographics

See also
Cantons of the Ain department 
Communes of France

References

Cantons of Ain
Name changes due to the George Floyd protests